Gavin Carrow (born 10 August 1960) is a Canadian wrestler. He competed in the men's freestyle 100 kg at the 1992 Summer Olympics.

References

External links
 

1960 births
Living people
Canadian male sport wrestlers
Olympic wrestlers of Canada
Wrestlers at the 1992 Summer Olympics
Sportspeople from Vancouver
Pan American Games medalists in wrestling
Pan American Games bronze medalists for Canada
Wrestlers at the 1987 Pan American Games
Wrestlers at the 1995 Pan American Games
20th-century Canadian people
21st-century Canadian people